Russula flavida is a member of the large mushroom genus Russula, described in 1880 by American botanist and mycologist Charles Christopher Frost and found in North America and parts of Asia. It has a bright yellow to orange yellow cap and stipe and white gills.

The species is edible and contains the pigment russulaflavidin and a related compound.

A variant, R. flavida var. dhakurianus, was described in 2005 from Kumaon in the Indian Himalaya.

References

External links

flavida
Edible fungi